Jessica Rylan (born 1974) is a sound artist, electronic musician and engineer from Boston, Massachusetts. Most of Rylan's work is based on the design and construction of DIY modular synthesizers, which she then uses to create a variety of sounds combined with her own vocal performance. Her work has been described as "a set of weird hybrids - noise pop, folk noise", and "sometimes rough, sometimes playful, sometimes confessional." She describes herself as an "artist turned engineer," and has cited Merzbow as an influence upon her own work.

Childhood and education 
Rylan grew up in Boston, Massachusetts and was based in Boston for the beginning of her career. She has played music for most of her life and began with classical training. Ryan also sang, read music, and played musical instruments in her early years. Her grandfather was an electrical engineer and was her first influence in the area of electronics. He taught her about electronics and helped her first build machines. The magazine Popular Electronics was also an inspiration to Rylan when she was growing up.

Rylan received an MFA degree in electronic music from Bard College in 2003. She was a research affiliate at MIT’s Center for Advanced Visual Studies from 2006 to 2010. Rylan received a BS degree in electrical engineering from University of Massachusetts Lowell in 2010. She has received grants from Penny McCall Foundation and the LEF Foundation and is currently a PhD candidate in Electrical Engineering at Stanford University.

Career
Rylan is a solo artist, working as the noise band Can't, or under her own name. She has performed across the United States and toured in Europe, Russia, and Norway. Rylan's work has been released as a limited series on her own IRFP label, as well as recordings on Important Records (USA), Musica Excentrica (Russia), and Drop Of Blood Records (Netherlands), among others.

On 14 November 2007, Rylan gave an artist's talk at MIT's Centre For Advanced Visual Studies, discussing the development of her work, her influences and her work with Don Buchla.

Rylan is one of the artists featured in Totally Wired, a documentary about Andreas Schneider's infamous boutique electronic musical instrument shop called SchneidersBuero, in Berlin.

In January 2012, Rylan performed as part of Stanford University's KZSU 90.1FM's 24-hour 'Day Of Noise' experimental music broadcast.

Rylan has performed with various artists, including John Wiese, Thurston Moore and Wolf Eyes.

Business
Rylan started a business, Flower Electronics, in 2006 where she produces editions of her instruments for purchase. These include: Little Boy Blue, Personal Synth, Natural Synth, Battery Powered Noise Generator, Modular Synthesizer, Controller, White Face, Blue Box, Arvin Radio, Bogen Intercom, Intermodulator #1.

Rylan discusses the process behind (and details the schematics for) her DIY Personal Synthesizer (2004) build in an article for the Vague Terrain journal.

References

1974 births
Living people
American electronic musicians
American women in electronic music
21st-century American women